Finnish Paralympic Committee is the National Paralympic Committee in Finland for the Paralympic Games movement. It is a non-profit organisation that selects teams, and raises funds to send Finnish competitors to Paralympic events organised by the International Paralympic Committee (IPC).

The organisation was founded in 1994.

The visual identity was created by British designer Richard Johnson.

See also
Finland at the Paralympics
Finnish Olympic Committee

References

External links

 Official website

Finland
Finland at the Paralympics
Pa
1994 establishments in Finland
Disability organisations based in Finland